STIR (Signal Tracking and Illumination Radar) is a medium-to-long range fire-control radar system manufactured by Thales Group. It is used for electro-optical tracking and missile illumination.

Model

Operators
Source:

See also
 Korean Navy radar lock-on incident – Japan alleged Korean Navy destroyer irradiated a Japanese Maritime patrol aircraft with STIR 1.8.

References

External links
 STIR page of Thales Group

Naval radars
Thales Group
Military radars of the Netherlands